Ledina Mandia (born June 3, 1974) served as Deputy Prime Minister in the Cabinet of Albania. She was the third woman to be appointed to the position. She is a technocrat, independent politician, appointed to the post after months of opposition demonstrations, demanding technocrat Ministers in the government. She was proposed by the Democratic Party.

Biography 
She was born in Tirana on 3 June 1974. She finished her Law Studies in the University of Shkodër, where she worked as a full-time lecturer. Later in 2005 she finished her Master and Ph.D.Studies in the University of Tirana.

During 2007 - 2013 she worked for the Advocate General office, serving as Head of the Institution from 2010 until 2013. During her time as General Advocate she represented Albania in several arbitration processes. 

Since May 2017 she serves as Deputy Prime Minister of Albania. Before taking the position of Deputy Prime Minister she served shortly as policy adviser to the President of Albania.

References

External links 
 Official Website of the Albanian Council of Ministers

1974 births
Living people
Politicians from Tirana
University of Tirana alumni
21st-century Albanian politicians
21st-century Albanian women politicians
Government ministers of Albania
Deputy Prime Ministers of Albania